"How to Love" is a song by American electronic music group Cash Cash. It was released on April 29, 2016 as the second single from their fourth studio album, Blood, Sweat & 3 Years and features Mexican singer and songwriter Sofía Reyes. A digital remix EP of "How to Love" was released on May 27, 2016.

Composition and lyrics
"How to Love" was written by Ilsey Juber, Jennifer Decilveo, brothers Jean Paul and Alex Makhlouf and Samuel Frisch while production was handled by the group. The song has been described as "upbeat" and "tropical" with influences of house, folk, and blues music and lyrics that are considered "super relatable." Speaking about the song, group member Samuel Frisch stated, "It’s hard to maintain relationships, even just friendships. You start to miss the people you love and care about." JP Makhlouf spoke about working with Sofía Reyes stating, "She was the best and easiest to work." According to Reyes, the song was finished within hours.

Reception
Billboard called the track, "a sun-kissed summer jam featuring rich, playful vocals from rising Mexican singer/songwriter Sofía Reyes. It’s youthful and enchanting, somehow energetic and soothing all at the same time." Dancing Astronaut stated that the song is, "a summer-ready jam."

Music video
The music video for "How to Love" premiered on April 29, 2016 and was filmed in Los Angeles. The video was directed by Roboshobo and was shot in one day.

Track listing

Personnel
Credits for "How to Love" adapted from AllMusic.

 Jean Paul Makhlouf – composer, producer
 Alex Makhlouf – composer, producer
 Samuel Frisch – composer, producer
 Sofía Reyes – featured artist, vocals

Charts

Weekly charts

Year-end charts

References

2016 songs
Cash Cash songs
2016 singles
Big Beat Records (American record label) singles